Ece Yaşar (born February 20, 1990) is a Turkish female karateka competing currently in the kumite -61 kg division. She competes for  TED Ankara Kolejliler.

Yaşar is a student at the sports academy of Hacettepe University in Ankara.

She won a gold medal at the 16th Balkan Children and Seniors Karate Championships in Herceg Novi, Montenegro in 2012. The same year, she won a bronze medal at the 47th European Karate Championships in Adeje, Spain, and later another bronze medal at the 2012 University World Karate Championships held in Bratislava, Slovakia.

She took the bronze medal in the -61 kg division at the 2013 Islamic Solidarity Games held in Palembang, Indonesia.

Achievements

References

1990 births
Sportspeople from Ankara
Living people
Turkish female karateka
Turkish female martial artists
Hacettepe University alumni
Islamic Solidarity Games medalists in karate
Islamic Solidarity Games competitors for Turkey
21st-century Turkish women